St. Albans station may refer to:
 St. Albans station (LIRR)
 St. Albans (Amtrak station)

See also 
 St. Alban station